The 1992 Nutri-Metics Bendon Classic was a women's tennis tournament played on outdoor hard courts at the ASB Tennis Centre in Auckland in New Zealand that was part of Tier V of the 1992 WTA Tour. It was the seventh edition of the tournament and was held from 27 January through to 2 February 1992. Unseeded Robin White won the singles title.

Finals

Singles
 Robin White defeated  Andrea Strnadová 2–6, 6–4, 6–3
 It was White's second WTA title of her career.

Doubles
 Rosalyn Fairbank-Nideffer /  Raffaella Reggi defeated  Jill Hetherington /  Kathy Rinaldi 1–6, 6–1, 7–5

See also
 1992 Benson and Hedges Open – men's tournament

References

External links
 ITF tournament edition details
 Tournament draws

Nutri-Metics Bendon Classic
WTA Auckland Open
Nutri
ASB
ASB
1992 in New Zealand tennis